Species III is a 2004 science fiction action thriller television film. The film is a sequel to Species II (1998) and the third installment of the Species series. Directed by Brad Turner and stars Robin Dunne, Robert Knepper, Sunny Mabrey, Amelia Cooke and John Paul Pitoc. Natasha Henstridge, who was contracted to a trilogy commencing with the first Species film, briefly reprises the role of Eve in the opening scene.

The film premiered on the American channel Syfy on November 27, 2004, and released on DVD on December 7, in both a standard and an unrated version. The film was shot in HD video.

Plot
Hours after the events of the previous film, the ambulance transporting the lifeless Eve has lost its way, but when the co-driver tries to radio their superiors, the driver, Dr. Bruce Abbot, stops and holds him at gunpoint. They are ambushed by Portus, who kills the co-driver with his tongue. Abbot discovers both Portus and Eve in the back of the ambulance; Portus strangles Eve to death while she gives birth to a newborn alien, which Abbot flees with. Government agent Wasach orders an autopsy, discovering Eve's pregnancy, then has her body burned.

Abbot returns to his usual job teaching biochemistry at a university, where he teaches his belief that it is wrong to decide whether a species should live or die. He raises Eve's child in his home and she grows into a young girl who he names Sara. One night at Abbot's office, he is visited by Portus, who has dramatically aged and is critically ill. While Abbot tries to treat him, Portus demands to see "it" (Eve's child) and reveals to Abbot that there are other half-breeds suffering from similar illnesses. Afterward, he dies horribly while sitting in the chair. Shocked by these events, Abbot approaches Dean, one of his students whose funding for an experimental power plant project is in jeopardy and asks for his aid in perfecting the alien DNA to save the species. In return, Abbot promises Dean a share of any funding or awards their work receives.

In Abbot's absence, Sara pupates inside a cocoon and emerges as an adult. Abbot's superior, Dr. Nicholas Turner, arrives at the house seeking Abbot and comes across Sara, who initially tries to seduce him but then rejects him. He attempts to rape her and Sara kills him. Sara leaves to seek a mate and Abbot returns home, and sees evidence of Sara's transformation and disposes of Turner's body. Sara eventually connects with another half-breed, but discovers his illnesses and knocks his tooth out. As Abbot and Dean continue their experiments on Sara, Dean begins to bond with her. Abbot informs Dean of the government's "Project Athena", which created Sil in the first film and Sara's heritage as the child of Patrick Ross infected with alien DNA from Mars and Eve, Sil's clone. The half-breed that Sara rejected breaks into the lab, mortally wounds Abbot and attempts to impregnate Sara, but is killed by hydrochloric gas Abbot sprays over the lab. Left alone, Dean ponders whether to continue Abbot's work, and Sara urges him to save her species.

Dean's roommate at the university, Hastings, discovers a website posted by a woman named Amelia who wants to date biochemists. After snooping through Dean's notes, he forwards them to Amelia, who agrees to meet him. En route, Amelia - who is another half-breed - has sex with and murders a gas station attendant who attempts to rape her. At the campus, she senses Sara and kidnaps Hastings, taking him to Abbot's home. Both Amelia and Sara force Hastings to work on perfecting the alien DNA using Sara's purer biology to save the half-breeds and create perfect mating partners for them. Agent Wasach, whose team also monitored Amelia's website and discovered its connection to Project Athena, picks up Dean and helps him save Hastings.

Dean, Hastings, and Wasach flee to Dean's experimental power plant with Sara and Amelia in pursuit. While attempting to keep Sara's harvested eggs away from them, the three decide to try trapping Amelia and Sara in the plant's core, but this tactic risks causing a catastrophic meltdown. Dean drops the eggs into the core, prompting Amelia to attempt to kill him, but Sara attacks her and throws her into the core as well. Dean, Hastings, and Wasach manage to close the core in time to prevent a meltdown.

Later, Hastings visits Dean at Abbot's home and discovers both Sara and a half-breed alien boy. Dean reveals that he actually managed to pull Sara to safety before sealing the plant's core, then completed the refined alien DNA to create a mate for her so she would not be alone. After the boy is grown, Dean tells Sara she is on her own and to be careful, but before Sara and her mate leave, Dean asks Sara why she saved him from Amelia when there was no reason to. She does not answer; however, it is implied that she has come to care for him. Dean then reassures the nervous Hastings by revealing that he had ensured that Sara's mate would be sterile, preventing them from reproducing.

Cast
 Robin Dunne as Dean
 Robert Knepper as Dr. Bruce Abbot
 Sunny Mabrey as Sara
  Savanna Fields as Young Sara
 Amelia Cooke as Amelia
 John Paul Pitoc as Hastings
 Michael Warren as Agent Wasach
 Christopher Neame as Dr. Nicholas Turner
 Patricia Bethune as Colleen
 Joel Stoffer as Portus
 Christopher R. Gillum as Young Portus
 James Leo Ryan as Yosef
 Reed Frerichs as ISD Staffer
 Marc D. Wilson as Crew Chief
 Matthew Yang King as Specialist Robert Kelley
 Jason Sarcinelli as Adult Male Alien
 Natasha Henstridge as Eve

Production
Executive producer Frank Mancuso Jr., who also worked on the previous Species films, wanted the sequel to be aimed more at young adults, so the characters were written to be younger than what was originally planned. They decided to cast Sunny Mabrey as the main blonde alien. Amelia Cooke was also taken for the role. Also, Mancuso wanted the creatures to look slightly different from H.R. Giger's original concept. The alien species was then redesigned by Rob Hinderstien.

Reception
Species III received mostly negative reviews, holding a 17% rating on Rotten Tomatoes based on six reviews. DVD Talk negatively reviewed the film saying "this film is underdeveloped with an absurd plot and bad special effects, this film just reuses old ideas and is not worth your time, it is a pointless sequel that lacks an effective story to make it a watchable film, it is just camouflaged by nudity". Den of Geek! said: "If you are going to start watching this franchise, you should give this one a miss and cut straight to the final film".

Sequel
A fourth film, Species: The Awakening, was released straight-to-television in 2007. While it does continue the [[Species (film series)|Species series]], it was a standalone film, not a direct follow-up to Species III''.

References

External links

2004 science fiction films
American action thriller films
2000s English-language films
Films directed by Brad Turner
Metro-Goldwyn-Mayer films
Species (film series)
Films about rape in the United States
Direct-to-video sequel films
Television sequel films
Syfy original films
2000s monster movies
Films scored by Elia Cmíral
Films set in universities and colleges
American horror television films
American pregnancy films
2004 films
2000s pregnancy films
Films set in 1998
2000s American films